Huntly railway station is a railway station near the town of Huntly, Victoria, Australia, located west of the Wakeman Road level crossing. It opened on 16 July 2022 as part of the Regional Rail Revival project. It is on the Echuca line between the disused Huntly and Bagshot railway stations.

Platforms and services
Huntly has one platform, and is served by Echuca line trains.

Platform 1:
 services to Southern Cross and Echuca

References

Regional railway stations in Victoria (Australia)
Transport in Bendigo
Railway stations in Australia opened in 2022